The Department of the Premier and Cabinet (DPC) is a department of the Government of South Australia. It is the main agency supporting the Premier and Cabinet by developing policy and delivering their programs.

Purpose and role
, DPC's purpose and role includes the following:
Delivering specialist policy advice to the Premier
 Helping Cabinet to function effectively as a decision-making body
 Overseeing Commonwealth-state and international diplomatic relations
Providing a single agency focus in delivering core functions for:
Aboriginal community support and advice, including reconciliation and employment opportunities
multicultural affairs
leading, developing, funding and coordinating the arts, cultural and creative sector, including the care of the state's collections, buildings and other assets within this sector
Leading whole-of-government reforms and initiatives based on the Premier's vision for South Australia
Leading policy reform and delivering effective platforms for a strategic approach to communications, community engagement, cyber security, and digital technology and infrastructure.

Arts and culture

As of late 2018, after Steven Marshall's appointment as Premier after the March election, DPC took over most of the responsibilities previously under Arts South Australia, with others going to the Department of Innovation and Skills or Department of Education.

The statutory authorities taken over directly are:
Adelaide Festival Corporation
Adelaide Festival Centre Trust
Art Gallery of South Australia
Carrick Hill
Country Arts SA
History Trust of South Australia
South Australian Film Corporation
South Australian Museum
State Library of South Australia
State Opera of South Australia
State Theatre Company of South Australia
DPC also provides funding to:
 Australian Dance Theatre
Adelaide Fringe
Adelaide Symphony Orchestra
Tandanya National Aboriginal Cultural Institute
DPC manages and funds the following awards:
The Ruby Awards
Made in Adelaide Awards (for Adelaide Fringe artists)

The biennial Adelaide Festival Awards for Literature are managed by the State Library of South Australia (which is under the DPC).

In September 2019, the "Arts and Culture Plan, South Australia 2019–2024" was created by the Department. Marshall said when launching the plan: “The arts sector in South Australia is already very strong but it’s been operating without a plan for 20 years”. However the plan does not signal any new government support, even after the government's  cuts to arts funding when Arts South Australia was absorbed into DPC in 2018. Specific proposals within the plan include an “Adelaide in 100 Objects” walking tour, a new shared ticketing system for small to medium arts bodies, a five-year-plan to revitalise regional art centres, creation of an arts-focussed high school, and a new venue for the Adelaide Symphony Orchestra.

Publications and online resources
The department's activities are summarised in its Annual Reports. Other publications include range of policies, guidelines, reports and other documentation.

Lobbyist Register 
The Department maintains a register of all third-party political lobbyists who are currently lobbying in South Australia. The register includes the trading names of lobbying entities, names of persons engaged in lobbying and current lists of the clients they commercially represent.

Recent CEOs
Nick Reade: February 2021 – April 2022 
Kym Winter-Dewhirst: January 2015 – January 2017
Don Russell: February 2017 – March 2018
Jim McDowell: September 2018 – present

When in opposition, then Shadow Treasurer Rob Lucas criticised the salary paid to Russell as CEO, but when McDowell was appointed, the  annual salary was defended by Premier Marshall.

See also
Cabinet of South Australia

Notes

References

External links

Premier and Cabinet